The nickname "flying banana" or Flying Banana may be applied to:

Trains on British railways
 GWR diesel railcar – introduced in 1932
 InterCity 125 – referring to the original livery of the British Rail High Speed Train
 New Measurement Train – used by Network Rail to check track and signalling equipment

Other uses
 DFW B.I — Imperial German unarmed two-seat observation biplane with "banana-planform" wings (1914)
 Piasecki H-21 – a military helicopter
 Handley Page H.P.42 - a British biplane airliner
 HRP Rescuer – an American tandem-rotor helicopter
 Geostationary Banana Over Texas – a proposed work of art that received funding from the Canadian government but was never created
 Southern yellow-billed hornbill – a hornbill found in southern Africa
 The airplanes of Hughes Air West were known as "flying bananas" due to their distinctive banana-yellow fuselage and tail colors.